Olga Artamonova (born 26 September 1977) is a Kyrgyzstani former judoka who competed in the 2000 Summer Olympics where she finished in 9th place in the women's 63 kg class.

References

External links
 

1977 births
Living people
Kyrgyzstani female judoka
Olympic judoka of Kyrgyzstan
Judoka at the 2000 Summer Olympics
Judoka at the 2002 Asian Games
Asian Games competitors for Kyrgyzstan
Kyrgyzstani people of Russian descent